Almost Paradise is an American-Filipino crime drama television series produced by Dean Devlin and Gary Rosen. The series is the first American television series to be filmed entirely in the Philippines. It premiered March 30, 2020, on WGN America (now known as NewsNation) in the United States, and in the Philippines, it premiered on March 21, 2021, on Kapamilya Channel, Kapamilya Online Live and A2Z Channel 11. The series has been renewed for a second season on Amazon Freevee.

Premise
Former DEA Agent Alex Walker, forced into retirement, moves to the  island of Cebu in the Philippines. He purchases the hotel gift shop in the hopes of managing his stress and high blood pressure, but the wealthy and criminal element on the island keep drawing him back into law enforcement.

Cast

Main
Christian Kane as Alex Walker, a former DEA agent
Samantha Richelle as Detective Kai Mendoza
AC Bonifacio as teenage Kai.
Arthur Acuña as Ernesto Almares, Kai's partner
Nonie Buencamino as Ike Ocampo, chief of the Mactan Police Department
Ces Quesada as Cory Santos, the manager of the hotel

Supporting
Zsa Zsa Padilla as Gov. Nina Rosales
Angeli Bayani as Dra.Sara Patel
Sophia Reola as Rita Cordero
Ketchup Eusebio as Julio Torres
Lotlot De Leon as Gloria Bautista
Guji Lorenzana as Lester Cordero
Raymond Bagatsing as Detective Cesar Rabara
Will Devaughn as Jimmy Teo
Ryan Eigenmann as El Diablo
Richard Yap
Zaijian Jaranilla
Elijah Canlas

Episodes

Production
Almost Paradise is the first American television series to be shot entirely in the Philippines. The show boasts an all-Filipino staff and crew, assisted by Cebu locals for the shoot.

In September 2019, it was announced that ABS-CBN would be venturing into Hollywood television production for the U.S. film and TV producers Electric Entertainment, which is headed by Filipino-American producer Dean Devlin. A U.S. crime series set in Cebu, Almost Paradise aired in the United States via the cable company WGN America. The series began filming at Bigfoot Soundstage Cebu in November 2019.

Devlin mentioned in an interview on June 4, 2020, that WGN would not renew the show for a second season, but  that an unnamed streaming platform was willing to stream all of the episodes to gauge public response for another season. On January 19, 2021, it was announced that Almost Paradise was streaming online on Amazon Freevee. All episodes of the show were made available on demand as of February 1, 2021. It was IMDb TV who would end up renewing the show for a second season on February 8, 2022.

The show is distributed by Electric Entertainment in Europe, South America and the Middle East, and by ABS-CBN Entertainment in the Philippines.

Release
On January 19, 2020, the first trailer was released along with the announcement that the series would premiere on March 30, 2020.

International broadcast
 In the Philippines, the series is aired in Filipino-dubbed via Kapamilya Channel, Kapamilya Online Live and A2Z since March 21, 2021, replacing Pinoy Big Brother: Connect and replaced by He's Into Her. On April 9, 2021, the original version was released on iWantTFC. The series re-aired their Season 1 from January 7 to February 5, 2023 and airs every weekends 8:30 PM, replacing Maalaala Mo Kaya and Click, Like, Share.

References

External links

2020 American television series debuts
2020 American television series endings
2020s American crime drama television series
2021 Philippine television series debuts
2021 Philippine television series endings
Philippine crime television series
Philippine drama television series
Television shows filmed in the Philippines
WGN America original programming
ABS-CBN original programming